Josef Marha (born 2 June 1976) is a Czech former professional ice hockey player.

Playing career
Marha played in the National Hockey League for the Colorado Avalanche, Mighty Ducks of Anaheim and the Chicago Blackhawks, playing 159 regular season games with 21 goals and 32 assists for 53 points, picking up 32 penalty minutes.  On the Chicago Blackhawks, he was commonly referred to at the 'Captain of the 4th Line'. He was drafted 35th overall by the Quebec Nordiques in the 1994 NHL Entry Draft.

Marha left the NHL to join HC Davos of the Swiss National League A (NLA) in 2001. He spent the next 12 years of his professional career, capturing 5 league titles with Davos, before announcing his retirement at the conclusion of the clubs involvement in the 2012–13 season on March 17, 2013.

In his return to his native Czech Republic, Marha announced the continuation of his playing career by agreeing to a multi-year deal with HC Pardubice of the Czech Extraliga on April 29, 2013. After only 23 games with Pardubice, Marha opted to terminate his contract with the club, and transfer to fellow Extraliga club, HK Hradec Kralove on November 30, 2013.

Career statistics

Regular season and playoffs

International

Awards and honours

References

External links

1976 births
Living people
Chicago Blackhawks players
Cincinnati Mighty Ducks players
Colorado Avalanche players
Cornwall Aces players
Czech ice hockey centres
HC Davos players
HC Dukla Jihlava players
HC Dynamo Pardubice players
Hershey Bears players
Mighty Ducks of Anaheim players
Norfolk Admirals players
Sportspeople from Havlíčkův Brod
Portland Pirates players
Quebec Nordiques draft picks
Stadion Hradec Králové players
Czech expatriate ice hockey players in Canada
Czech expatriate ice hockey players in the United States
Czech expatriate ice hockey players in Switzerland